This is an episode list for the television series The Adventures of Chuck and Friends which aired on The Hub's block HubBub.

Series overview

Episodes

Season 1 (2010-2011)

Season 2 (2011-2012)
The show's second season had been cut in half mid-production due to concerns that show-related toys are not selling as well as anticipated.  Season 2 had only 13 episodes, instead of 26.

Special (2011)

External links
 

Lists of American children's animated television series episodes
Lists of Canadian children's animated television series episodes